The Dean of St Edmundsbury is the head (primus inter pares – first among equals) and chair of the chapter of canons, the ruling body of St Edmundsbury Cathedral. The dean and chapter are based at the Cathedral Church of Saint James in Bury St Edmunds. Before 2000 the post was designated as a provost, which was then the equivalent of a dean at most English cathedrals. The cathedral is the mother church of the Diocese of St Edmundsbury and Ipswich and seat of the Bishop of St Edmundsbury and Ipswich. The current dean is Joe Hawes.

List of deans

Provosts
1929–1940 John Herbert Orpen
1940–1958 John White
1958–1976 John Waddington
1976–1981 David Maddock
1981–1994 Raymond Furnell
1995–19 November 2000 James Atwell (became Dean)

Deans
19 November 2000–2006 James Atwell
2006–2009 Neil Collings
16 October 2010October 2017 Frances Ward
October 201714 July 2018 Graeme Knowles (acting)
14 July 2018present: Joe Hawes

References

Deans of Saint Edmundsbury
Deans of Saint Edmundsbury
 
Deans of Saint Edmundsbury
Diocese of St Edmundsbury and Ipswich